Lomaiviti may refer to:

 Lomaiviti Islands
Lomaiviti District
 Lomaiviti Province
 Lomaiviti language
 Lomaiviti (Fijian Communal Constituency, Fiji)